Korea — Anti-Dumping Duties on Imports of Certain Paper from Indonesia or Korea — Certain Paper or WT/DS312 is a dispute between Indonesia on April 7, 2010 forwarded to the World Trade Organization ( WTO ) and South Korea over Indonesian paper imports. South Korea accused Indonesia of "dumping" (pricing below cost) paper export, and forced some Indonesian paper producers to pay a higher tariff. On June 4, 2004 Indonesia requested that South Korea hold bilateral consultations. However, a bilateral consultation on July 7, 2004 failed to reach an agreement.

See also
List of WTO dispute settlement cases

References

External links 
 Official list of WTO dispute settlement cases

Law of Indonesia
Dumping (pricing policy)
Indonesia–South Korea relations